Balasore College of Engineering and Technology is a private technological college in Sergarh, Baleshwar, Odisha. The college has eight academic departments for polytechnics and engineering. Established in the year 2001, it is one of the oldest private colleges of Odisha and the largest technical institute in the Baleshwar district. It is an AICTE-approved institute and is an ISO 9001:2008-certified institute.

References

Private engineering colleges in India
Engineering colleges in Odisha
Colleges affiliated with Biju Patnaik University of Technology
Education in Balasore district
Educational institutions established in 2001
2001 establishments in Orissa
Balasore